Terrence Paul Melcher (born Terrence Paul Jorden; February 8, 1942 – November 19, 2004) was an American record producer, singer, and songwriter who was instrumental in shaping the mid-to-late 1960s California Sound and folk rock movements. His best-known contributions were producing the Byrds' first two albums Mr. Tambourine Man (1965) and Turn! Turn! Turn! (1965), as well as most of the hit recordings of Paul Revere & the Raiders and Gentle Soul.  He is also known for his collaborations with Bruce Johnston and for his association with the Manson Family.

Melcher was the only child of actress/singer Doris Day; his father was Day's first husband Al Jorden, and he was adopted by her third husband Martin Melcher. Most of his early recordings were with the vocal surf acts the Rip Chords and Bruce & Terry.  In the 1960s, Melcher was acquainted with the Beach Boys and later produced several singles for the group in the 1980s and the 1990s, including "Kokomo" (1988), which topped U.S. record charts.

Background
Terrence Paul Jorden was born in New York City to singer-actress Doris Day and her first husband, trombonist Al Jorden. Known as "Terry", the boy was named by his mother after the hero of her favorite childhood comic strip, Terry and the Pirates.

Before his birth, Day was planning to divorce Al Jorden because of his violent temper and alleged physical abuse. Jorden responded to his wife's pregnancy by demanding that she get an abortion. Shortly after giving birth, Day filed for divorce and left the infant with her mother in Ohio while she went back to touring with big band leader Les Brown. After the divorce, Jorden visited his son infrequently and had little presence in his life.

After divorcing her second husband, saxophonist George Weidler, Day married Martin Melcher, who would become her manager and produce many of her films. Melcher adopted Terry and gave him his surname. In his freshman and sophomore high-school years, Terry attended the Loomis Chaffee School in Connecticut, then returned to California for his junior and senior years at Beverly Hills High School. He subsequently attended Principia College in Illinois for a short time. After Martin Melcher's death in 1968, Day discovered that he had mismanaged or embezzled $20 million from her, while Terry claimed that his stepfather had mistreated him as a child.

Early career

Melcher has been credited with helping to shape the sound of 1960s surf music in California. In the early 1960s, Melcher and Bruce Johnston formed the vocal duet Bruce & Terry. The duo had hits like "Custom Machine" and "Summer Means Fun". Melcher and Johnston also created another group, The Rip Chords, which had a Top 10 hit with "Hey Little Cobra". Later, Johnston would join the Beach Boys.

By the mid-1960s, Melcher had joined the staff of Columbia Records and went on to work with the Byrds. He produced their hit cover versions of Bob Dylan's "Mr. Tambourine Man" and Pete Seeger's "Turn! Turn! Turn!", as well as the corresponding albums Mr. Tambourine Man and Turn! Turn! Turn!.

Following conflicts with the band and their manager, Melcher was replaced as producer by Allen Stanton and then Gary Usher, although he would work with the Byrds again on their Ballad of Easy Rider, (Untitled) and Byrdmaniax albums. Melcher also worked with Paul Revere & the Raiders, Wayne Newton, Frankie Laine, Jimmy Boyd, Pat Boone, Glen Campbell, Mark Lindsay and the Mamas & the Papas. He was instrumental in signing Los Angeles band the Rising Sons, led by Taj Mahal and Ry Cooder.

Melcher performed on the Beach Boys' album Pet Sounds, playing tambourine on "That's Not Me" and "God Only Knows", and was a board member of the Monterey Pop Foundation and a producer of the Monterey Pop Festival in 1967.

Manson Family

In 1968, Beach Boy Dennis Wilson introduced Melcher to ex-con and aspiring musician Charles Manson. Manson and his "family" had been living in Wilson's house at 14400 Sunset Boulevard after Wilson had picked up hitchhiking Manson family members Patricia Krenwinkel and Ella Jo Bailey. Wilson expressed interest in Manson's music and also recorded two of Manson's songs with the Beach Boys. For a time, Melcher was interested in recording Manson's music, as well as making a film about the family and their hippie commune existence. Manson met Melcher at 10050 Cielo Drive, the home that Melcher shared with his girlfriend, actress Candice Bergen, and musician Mark Lindsay.

Manson eventually auditioned for Melcher, but Melcher declined to sign him. There was still talk of a documentary being made about Manson's music, but Melcher abandoned the project after witnessing Manson fighting with a drunken stuntman at Spahn Ranch. Wilson and Melcher severed their ties with Manson, a move that angered Manson. Soon after, Melcher and Bergen moved out of the Cielo Drive home. The house's owner, Rudi Altobelli, then leased it to film director Roman Polanski and his wife, actress Sharon Tate. Manson was reported to have visited the house on more than one occasion asking for Melcher, but was told that Melcher had moved.

On August 8–9, 1969, the house was the site of the murders of Tate (who was eight months pregnant at the time), coffee heiress Abigail Folger, hairdresser Jay Sebring, writer Wojciech Frykowski and Steven Parent by members of Manson's "family". Some authors and law enforcement personnel have theorized that the Cielo Drive house was targeted by Manson as revenge for Melcher's rejection and that Manson was unaware that he and Bergen had moved out. However, family member Charles "Tex" Watson stated that Manson and company did, in fact, know that Melcher was no longer living there, and Melcher's former roommate Mark Lindsay stated, "Terry and I talked about it later and Terry said Manson knew (Melcher had moved) because Manson or someone from his organization left a note on Terry's porch in Malibu.

At that time, Melcher was producing singer Jimmy Boyd's music for A&M Records. After initial tracks were recorded, the Manson murders occurred, reportedly prompting Melcher to go into seclusion, and the session was never completed. When Manson was arrested, it was widely reported that he had sent his followers to the house to kill Melcher and Bergen. Manson family member Susan Atkins, who admitted her part in the murders, stated to police and before a grand jury that the house was chosen as the scene for the murders "to instill fear into Terry Melcher because Terry had given us his word on a few things and never came through with them". Melcher took to employing a bodyguard and told Manson prosecutor Vincent Bugliosi that his fear was so great he had been undergoing psychiatric treatment. Melcher was described as the most frightened of the witnesses at the trial, even though Bugliosi assured him that "Manson knew you were no longer living [on Cielo Drive]".

In his 2019 book CHAOS: Charles Manson, the CIA, and the Secret History of the Sixties, Tom O'Neil reexamined the Manson case and found evidence Melcher may have been more closely involved with the Manson family than he admitted at trial. In reviewing police files and other data, O'Neill found evidence Melcher was associating with Manson after the Tate-Labianca murders, before Manson's arrest four months later. These documents, seemingly hidden by Bugliosi, undermined claims the Tate murders were intended to frighten Melcher in revenge for his refusal to record Manson's music. O'Neill also found documents indicating Melcher was having sex with 15-year-old Manson family member Ruth Ann Moorehouse. Dean Moorehouse, Ruth Ann's father and a Manson Family member, also had resided at 10050 Cielo Drive with Melcher. Tex Watson would frequently visit the residence.

Later years
Melcher again acted as producer for the Byrds on Ballad of Easy Rider, their eighth album, released in November 1969. The album peaked at No. 36 on the Billboard charts. At the time it was met with mixed reviews but is today regarded as one of the band's stronger albums from the latter half of their career.

In the early 1970s, Melcher produced the Byrds' 9th and 10th albums, (Untitled) and Byrdmaniax. However, Byrdmaniax was not well-received; band member Gene Parsons referred to the album as "Melcher's Folly" because of its heavy overdubs of horns and strings, which were done without the band's knowledge. During this time, Melcher dabbled in real estate and served as the executive producer of his mother's CBS series, The Doris Day Show. He later recorded two solo albums, Terry Melcher and Royal Flush. Writing of the former in Christgau's Record Guide: Rock Albums of the Seventies (1981), Robert Christgau said:
Most will find this producer's daydream sterile at best and noxious at worst, but I like the song about his shrink and am fascinated by his compulsion to defend his Manson connections. With the requisite show of wealth and taste, he insists that he's only a spectator — why, he wouldn't even know about the hand jive if it weren't for Soul Train. Alternate title: It's Alright Ma, I'm Only Watching.
In 1985, Melcher co-produced the cable show Doris Day's Best Friends and worked as the director and vice president of the Doris Day Animal Foundation. He and his mother, to whom he remained close throughout his life, also co-owned the Cypress Inn, a small hotel in Carmel-by-the-Sea, California.

In 1988, Melcher earned a Golden Globe nomination for co-writing the song "Kokomo" with John Phillips, Scott McKenzie and Mike Love. Recorded by the Beach Boys, the song was featured in the 1988 Tom Cruise film Cocktail and hit No. 1 (the band's career fourth overall) on the Billboard Hot 100. The single was certified gold with U.S. sales of more than one million copies. Melcher produced the band's 1992 studio record Summer in Paradise, which was the first record produced digitally on Pro Tools.

Death
On November 19, 2004, Melcher died at his home in Beverly Hills, California after a long battle with melanoma.

Discography

References

External links

 
 Ryan Melcher's Website

1942 births
2004 deaths
Record producers from New York (state)
Surf music record producers
American male singer-songwriters
American singer-songwriters
American people of German descent
Deaths from cancer in California
Deaths from melanoma
California Sound
Loomis Chaffee School alumni
Doris Day
20th-century American male singers
20th-century American singers